Skepticism is a Finnish funeral doom metal band. Formed in 1991, they are regarded as one of the pioneers of the genre.

History

Starting out with a death metal sound on their first 7", Skepticism soon began to evolve into a more distinctive style, a combination of slow doom metal and death metal with prolific use of keyboards, especially using an organ sound. The keyboards intend to create a depressive sound, rather than the gothic sound that many metal bands using keyboards tend to focus on. This style was first heard on the Aeothe Kaear demo (1994), which was still up-tempo compared to the material that was to follow. The debut full-length Stormcrowfleet (1995) took that style a step further, consisting of six long and slow tracks with an average length of nearly ten minutes each.

After this, the band released its first 'pair', an EP and album which are thematically connected: Ethere (1997) and Lead and Aether (1998). In 1999, Aes was released, a one-track EP lasting almost 28 minutes, and another departure into different stylistic territory from the band. A variety of musical themes are explored before the song turns back upon itself and returns to the opening theme.

The band's latest releases were contained in the second 'pair', The Process of Farmakon (2002) and Farmakon (2003). These releases involve another slight departure from earlier releases, by introducing more elements of dissonance and experimentation. Their 2008 release is called Alloy. In 2015, Skepticism released Ordeal, which was recorded live in front of an audience.

In 2021, the band announced their upcoming sixth album, Companion, and a music video for the song "Calla".

Band members
Matti Tilaeus - vocals (1991-)
Jani Kekarainen - guitar (1991-)
Eero Pöyry - keyboards (1991-)
Lasse Pelkonen - drums (1991-)

Live musicians
Timo Sitomaniemi – guitars (2015-)

Former members
Tobias Kellgren - vocals (1991-1993)

Discography

Studio albums
 Stormcrowfleet (1995, Red Stream)
 Lead and Aether (1997, Red Stream)
 Farmakon (2003, Red Stream)
 Alloy (2008, Red Stream)
 Ordeal (2015, Svart Records)
 Companion (2021, Svart Records)

Demos, singles and EPs
 "Towards My End" (7" Single, 1992)
 Aeothe Kaear (Demo, 1994)
 Ethere (EP, 1997, Red Stream)
 Aes (EP, 1998, Red Stream)
 The Process of Farmakon (EP, 2002,  Red Stream)

External links
 Skepticism – official band website since early 2008
 farmakon.com used to be the official band website between early 2003 and late 2005
Skepticism on Myspace
 Svart Records – Skepticism's record label 2015
 
2003 interview with Eero Pöyry at doom-metal.com

Finnish heavy metal musical groups
Finnish doom metal musical groups
Musical groups established in 1991
Musical quartets
1991 establishments in Finland
Funeral doom musical groups